Kangsŏn station is a major railway station used by passenger and freight trains in Kangch'ŏl-dong, Ch'ŏllima-guyŏk, Namp'o Special City, North Korea, on the P'yŏngnam Line of the Korean State Railway. It is also the starting point of the freight-only Chamjilli Line.

History
The station was opened on 1 July 1923 by the Chosen Government Railway. The Ch'ŏllima Steel Complex just to the south of the station, one of the DPRK's largest steel mills, is served by this station via an extensive network of trackage on the factory grounds.

See also
 Kangson enrichment site
 Chollima Steel Complex

References

Railway stations in North Korea
Railway stations opened in 1923